The Stadio Riviera delle Palme is a multi-use stadium in San Benedetto del Tronto, Italy.  It is currently used mostly for football matches and is the home ground of S.S. Sambenedettese Calcio.  The stadium has a capacity of 13,708 and it lies between San Benedetto and its civil parish Porto d'Ascoli.

History 

The stadium, with a steel supporting structure based on a structural design by Eng. Luigi Corradi and architect of the arch. Vincenzo Acciarri, was built in the mid-80s and awarded at European level as the best sports work in steel and prefabricated reinforced concrete. It was inaugurated on 10 August 1985 with a friendly match between S.S. Lazio and S.S. Sambenedettese Calcio, although many consider the unofficial inauguration of 13 August 1985 with a friendly match between A.C. Milan and Sambenedettese, a team that competes in the home matches and has its registered office, as well as  spectators in the stands.

Description 

Initially it had a capacity of about  spectators, it was designed for the possibility of a future extension. Later, to comply with safety regulations in the stadiums, the authorized capacity was reduced to  places.

Since 2010, after the refurbishment works, the capacity has been increased to around 14,000 numbered seats, all seated, arranged on two rings with full coverage in all sectors, complete the structure four towers of 'angle in prestressed concrete, which favor the inflow and outflow of spectators, incorporate a small bar, toilets and High-mast lighting for lighting sports venue. Above the cover is placed a paneling of Photovoltaic system.

Curiosity 

 Above the stadium roof there is a photovoltaic system, with  Solar panel in Polycrystalline silicon of 220 nominal power. It is the second Italian stadium, after Stadio Marc'Antonio Bentegodi, to use this solution for alternative energy production.
 In 1987 hosted the playoff valid for the promotion in Serie A Cesena – Lecce, ended 2–1; on the stands beyond 18,000 spectators.
 The absolute record number of spectators was recorded on 11 August 1997 with the friendly Juventus F.C. – FC Bayern Munich: about 23,000 present.
 In 2013 on the  Calcioweb  website it was included in the list of the most beautiful stadiums in Italy.

References

Riviera delle Palme
A.S. Sambenedettese